Joseph Gérard Marquis Tardif (born June 12, 1949) is a Canadian former professional ice hockey left winger who played in both the National Hockey League (NHL) and the World Hockey Association (WHA), principally for the Quebec Nordiques, and is the all-time leading goal scorer in the WHA.

Playing career
Born in Granby, Quebec, Tardif played two seasons with the Montreal Junior Canadiens of the Quebec Major Junior Hockey League. The Montreal Canadiens - in the final year the National Hockey League team had the privilege to do so - invoked its right to select two French Canadian players first and second overall to pick Tardif in the first round, second overall, of the 1969 NHL Amateur Draft. Tardif spent most of the 1969–70 NHL season with the American Hockey League (AHL) Montreal Voyageurs, one of the leading scorers on a team studded with future NHL stars, including Jude Drouin, Guy Charron, Guy Lapointe and Pete Mahovlich. He made the Canadiens for good the following season, playing credibly for the eventual Stanley Cup champions. In 1972, Tardif scored 31 goals.

WHA years
In 1973 Tardif signed with the Los Angeles Sharks of the World Hockey Association. He was the Sharks' leading scorer that season, and was named to play for Team Canada in the 1974 Summit Series the following fall. The Sharks, however, finished with the league's poorest record, and moved to Detroit as the Michigan Stags, where Tardif played brilliantly before a trade to the Quebec Nordiques, just weeks before the Stags folded.

In Quebec, Tardif became one of the league's preeminent stars. He finished the 1974–75 WHA season with 50 goals, and added a league-leading 10 goals in the playoffs en route to the AVCO Cup finals against the eventual champion Houston Aeros. The next season, he led the WHA in goals, assists and points by wide margins and became only the second professional player to score 70 goals in a single season, while the Nordiques rampaged to 50 wins. Tardif's playoffs were cut short after he incurred serious head injuries in an attack (on April 11, 1976) by Calgary Cowboys enforcer Rick Jodzio, leading to one of the first cases where a hockey player was charged in a court of law for assault.

The next season Tardif was named the captain of the Nordiques, and recovered to post another 100-point campaign while leading the team to their only WHA championship, and followed that up in 1977–78 with a 154-point campaign - setting a professional hockey record eventually broken by Wayne Gretzky (who would score 164 points in the 1980-81 NHL season)- for which he received his second league MVP award.

Retirement
Tardif remained a star when the Nordiques joined the NHL after the WHA folded in 1979, serving as the team's first NHL captain. Tardif retired after the 1982–83 NHL season, and the Nordiques retired his No. 8 jersey in tribute to their first great scoring star. He finished his career scoring 316 goals and 350 assists for 666 points in the WHA, and 194 goals and 207 assists for 401 points in the NHL. He owns car dealerships in Quebec City and Charlevoix.

Awards and achievements
 Stanley Cup champion — 1971, 1973 (with Montreal)
 Avco Cup champion — 1977 (with Quebec)
 First in WHA history in career goals, second in points, third in assists, and 20th in games played
 Won WHA scoring titles in 1976 and 1978
 Won the Gordie Howe Trophy as the WHA's most valuable player in 1976 and 1978
 Named to the WHA's First All-Star Team in 1976, 1977 and 1978
 Named to the WHA's Second All-Star Team in 1975
 Played in NHL All-Star Game in 1982
 Inaugural member of the World Hockey Association Hall of Fame (2010)

Career statistics

Regular season and playoffs

International

References

External links

1949 births
Baltimore Blades players
Ice hockey people from Quebec
Living people
Los Angeles Sharks players
Michigan Stags players
Montreal Canadiens draft picks
Montreal Canadiens players
Montreal Junior Canadiens players
Montreal Voyageurs players
National Hockey League first-round draft picks
National Hockey League players with retired numbers
People from Granby, Quebec
Quebec Nordiques (WHA) players
Quebec Nordiques players
Stanley Cup champions
Canadian ice hockey left wingers